The End was a nightclub in the West End of London, England. Started in December 1995 by DJs Layo Paskin and Mr C, it was also responsible for the label End Recordings.

Musical genres played there included techno and house on Saturday nights, drum and bass and breakbeat on Friday night, and indie on Monday with a club called Trash. The End also hosted other nights throughout the week and weekend, including a dubstep night on Wednesdays.

History 

Since its opening in 1995, many of the world's finest DJs played and/or hosted nights at The End at significant points in their careers. Roni Size won the Mercury Music Prize whilst hosting a residency at the club in 1997. Stewart Essence (Elusivewax) known for his groundbreaking deep house sets. Fatboy Slim was resident at the club when he went to number one in the UK charts in 1998, Layo & Bushwacka! released album Lowlife in 1999, Zero 7 were residents at the club for two years in the run-up to the 2001 release of Simple Things, Scissor Sisters played their first UK gig at the club, and Erol Alkan went from being chosen as Best Breakthrough DJ at the 2002 Muzik Awards through to winning Mixmag's DJ of the year in 2006. LCD Soundsystem played their second-ever show at The End in 2002.

The End closed permanently on 24 January 2009.

Reopening as The Den

Due to a slump in the property market, the property developers decided against turning The End into a block of flats, instead joining forces with some club promoters (John Alist) to open the venue up again in May 2009 as The Den. The Den itself subsequently closed in July 2012 when its licence was revoked by a magistrates court following a series of complaints and reports of shootings, stabbings and drug dealing.

See also

List of electronic dance music venues
 Superclub

References

External links
The End official website
DJ Mixes recorded at The End
The End's sister bar AKA official website

Nightclubs in London
Buildings and structures in the London Borough of Camden
Music venues completed in 1995
Tourist attractions in the London Borough of Camden
Electronic dance music venues